Pink Sauce is a pink dipping sauce created by private chef and TikTok user @chef.pii. The sauce went viral on TikTok in the summer of 2022, with over 680 million views on the #pinksauce hashtag. The product garnered controversy over safety and labeling concerns.

History 
Veronica Shaw, known as TikTok user @chef.pii, announced the creation of Pink Sauce via TikTok on June 11, 2022. Notably, the featured bottle was in a more purplish tone than what was released in an illegal and unsafe state to the public. The product was revised for human consumption and went on sale on July 1, 2022, and sold out sometime around August 3, 2022. Dave's Gourmet, the company that produces sauce featured in Hot Ones, partnered with Shaw and reformulated the recipe. There were plans to sell the sauce in retail stores in the fall of 2022. On January 11, 2023, following a reformulated recipe and packaging changes, ones who officially adhere to FDA regulations, Pink Sauce was made available in 4,000 Walmart locations across the United States.

Controversy 
The sauce has received controversy due to several issues with the safety and labeling of the product. Concerns include a discrepancy between the amount of sauce in the bottle and the amount the bottle is labeled with,  moreover that the color varies widely from batch to batch, that the product is poorly packaged, the alleged presence of ingredients not in the list of ingredients such as mayonnaise to thicken it, and the fact that it contains milk which, when packaged in a bag, could be infected by botulism. Some consumers of the sauce have allegedly been sent to the hospital, and there have also been reports of the product smelling and appearing rotten. At least one TikTok user falsified their death consuming Pink Sauce as "a full social experiment to see how quickly other people could spread misinformation."

On August 21, 2022, YouTuber MatPat made a video covering the pink sauce on his Food Theory channel, claiming the ingredients list was extremely unrealistic and that the food proportions on the label were inaccurate. He also attempted to figure out the genuine recipe. He recommended not to consume the sauce due to potential health risks.

Another video about the sauce was uploaded to the YouTube channel How To Cook That on December 2, 2022. The creator, Ann Reardon, who in the past has worked as a qualified food scientist and dietitian, was able to refute some of the most concerning allegations, like the danger of botulism and the need for additional, unlisted ingredients to get a result like Shaw's product.

Response from creator 
Shaw explained that she never weighed the product, so the discrepancy between the amount of product indicated on the bottle and the amount actually in the bottle was a guess. When asked about whether her product was approved by the FDA, she stated that her product is not a "medical product", which caused a further backlash, including commenters pointing out that the FDA is also responsible for regulating food. In July 2022, @chef.pii lied to consumers that the FDA approved her product, a statement proved false when the FDA announced a pending review in August.

In October 2022, Shaw appeared on Karamo Brown's talk show, Karamo, purportedly to address the controversies. @chef.pii appeared with @alluredbeauty, a fellow TikTok user who had criticized the quality of a shipment of Pink Sauce she had sent to a lab for testing. While the mistake in labeling was acknowledged, neither the shipment nor perishable contents of Pink Sauce were addressed by @chef.pii or Brown in the interview, who instead criticized @alluredbeauty for her commentary, with @chef.pii falsely accusing her of "fabricating" her claims about her product and "trying to tear down [her] business and [her] livelihood" and saying she wasn't special. The results of @alluredbeauty's commissioned lab test were never presented during the segment.

A video of the interview on the official Karamo Show YouTube account was brought to further media attention following live commentary by Twitch streamer MoistCr1TiKaL (Charles White Jr.), who had been previously following the Pink Sauce controversy. White described Brown and @chef.pii's interaction with @alluredbeauty as gaslighting, and questioned whether Brown or the studio audience were made aware before the interview that "[@chef.pii] shipped material that can't be shipped, and it spoiled for almost all of [her] customers." Following White's commentary, the video of the segment and a tweet promoting the video were deleted from the Karamo Show YouTube and Twitter accounts respectively.

FDA intervention 
On August 2, 2022, the FDA began to review the sauce. Prior on July 26, the creator was quoted saying "the F, f'ing, DA, federal, came to my business yesterday. I am 100% compliant, I'm abiding with the FDA," adding, "I'm not in trouble. I'm not going to jail." Shaw's claims of product safety and approval have yet to be verified by the FDA. This controversy added to the negative backlash towards the Pink Sauce. Shaw received no fines or litigation.

References 

American condiments
Florida cuisine
Food and drink introduced in 2022
Food safety scandals
Internet memes introduced in 2022
Sauces
TikTok